France was the host nation for the 1992 Winter Olympics in Albertville.  It was the third time that France had hosted the Winter Olympic Games (after the 1924 Games in Chamonix and the 1968 Games in Grenoble), and the fifth time overall (after the 1900 and 1924 Summer Olympics, both in Paris).

Medalists

Competitors
The following is the list of number of competitors in the Games.

Alpine skiing

Men

Men's combined

Women

Women's combined

Biathlon

Men

Men's 4 x 7.5 km relay

Women

Women's 3 x 7.5 km relay

 1 A penalty loop of 150 metres had to be skied per missed target.
 2 One minute added per missed target.

Bobsleigh

Cross-country skiing

Men

 1 Starting delay based on 10 km results. 
 C = Classical style, F = Freestyle

Men's 4 × 10 km relay

Women

 2 Starting delay based on 5 km results. 
 C = Classical style, F = Freestyle

Women's 4 × 5 km relay

Curling

Curling was a demonstration sport at the 1992 Winter Olympics.

Figure skating

Men

Women

Pairs

Ice Dancing

Freestyle skiing

Men

Women

Ice hockey

Group B
Twelve participating teams were placed in two groups. After playing a round-robin, the top four teams in each group advanced to the Medal Round while the last two teams competed in the consolation round for the 9th to 12th places.

Final round
Quarter-finals

Consolation round 5th-8th places

7th-place match

Contestants
Jean-Marc Djian
Fabrice Lhenry
Petri Ylönen
Stéphane Botteri
Gérald Guennelon
Michel Leblanc
Jean-Philippe Lemoine
Denis Perez
Serge Poudrier
Bruno Saunier
Peter Almásy
Mickaël Babin
Stéphane Barin
Philippe Bozon
Arnaud Briand
Yves Crettenand
Patrick Dunn
Benoît Laporte
Pascal Margerit
Christian Pouget
Pierre Pousse
Antoine Richer
Christophe Ville
Head coach: Kjell Larsson

Luge

Men

(Men's) Doubles

Nordic combined 

Men's individual

Events:
 normal hill ski jumping 
 15 km cross-country skiing 

Men's Team

Three participants per team.

Events:
 normal hill ski jumping 
 10 km cross-country skiing

Short track speed skating

Men

Women

Ski jumping 

Men's team large hill

 1 Four teams members performed two jumps each. The best three were counted.

Speed skating

Men

References

Official Olympic Reports
International Olympic Committee results database
 Olympic Winter Games 1992, full results by sports-reference.com

Nations at the 1992 Winter Olympics
1992
Winter Olympics